This year is notable for Apollo 11's first landing on the moon.

Events

January

 January 4 – The Government of Spain hands over Ifni to Morocco.
 January 5
 Ariana Afghan Airlines Flight 701 crashes into a house on its approach to London's Gatwick Airport, killing 50 of the 62 people on board and two of the home's occupants.
 January 14 – An explosion aboard the aircraft carrier USS Enterprise near Hawaii kills 27 and injures 314.
 January 19 – End of the siege of the University of Tokyo, marking the beginning of the end for the 1968–69 Japanese university protests.
 January 20 – Richard Nixon is sworn in as the 37th President of the United States.
 January 22 – An assassination attempt is carried out on Soviet leader Leonid Brezhnev by deserter Viktor Ilyin. One person is killed, several are injured. Brezhnev escaped unharmed.
 January 27
 Fourteen men, 9 of them Jews, are executed in Baghdad for spying for Israel.
 Reverend Ian Paisley, Northern Irish Unionist leader and founder of the Free Presbyterian Church of Ulster is jailed for three months for illegal assembly.
 January 28 – 1969 Santa Barbara oil spill: A blowout on Union Oil's Platform A spills 80,000 to 100,000 barrels of crude oil into a channel and onto the beaches of Santa Barbara County in Southern California; on February 5 the oil spill closes Santa Barbara's harbor. The incident inspires Wisconsin Senator Gaylord Nelson to organize the first Earth Day in 1970.

February

 February 4 – In Cairo, Yasser Arafat is elected Palestine Liberation Organization leader at the Palestinian National Congress.
 February 8
 The Allende meteorite explodes over Mexico.
 After 147 years, the last weekly issue of The Saturday Evening Post is published in the United States. (The magazine is later briefly resurrected as a monthly magazine.)
 February 9 – The Boeing 747 "jumbo jet" is flown for the first time, taking off from the Boeing airfield at Everett, Washington.
 February 13 – Front de libération du Québec (FLQ) terrorists bomb the Montreal Stock Exchange.
 February 14 – Pope Paul VI issues Mysterii Paschalis, a motu proprio, deleting many names from the Roman calendar of saints (including Valentine, who was celebrated on this day).
 February 17 – Aquanaut Berry L. Cannon dies of carbon dioxide poisoning while attempting to repair the SEALAB III habitat off San Clemente Island, California.
 February 24 – The Mariner 6 Mars probe is launched from the United States.

March

 March 2
 In Toulouse, France the first Concorde test flight is conducted.
 Soviet and Chinese forces clash at a border outpost on the Ussuri River.
 March 3
 Apollo program: NASA launches Apollo 9 (James McDivitt, Rusty Schweickart, David Scott) to test the lunar module.
 In a Los Angeles court, Sirhan Sirhan admits that he killed presidential candidate Robert F. Kennedy.
 March 13 – Apollo program: Apollo 9 returns safely to Earth after testing the Lunar Module.
 March 16 – Viasa Flight 742 crashes into a neighborhood in Maracaibo, Venezuela, shortly after taking off for Miami; all 84 people on board the DC-9 jet are killed along with 71 people on the ground.
 March 17
 Golda Meir becomes the first female prime minister of Israel.
 The Longhope life-boat is lost after answering a mayday call during severe storms in the Pentland Firth between Orkney and the northern tip of Scotland; the entire crew of 8 die.
 March 18 – An annular solar eclipse is visible in the Indian and Pacific Oceans, and is the 49th solar eclipse of Solar Saros 129.
 March 20
 One hundred of the 105 passengers and crew on a United Arab Airlines flight, most of them Muslim pilgrims returning to Aswan from Mecca, are killed when the Ilyushin-18 turboprop crashes during a sandstorm.
 John Lennon and Yoko Ono are married at Gibraltar, and proceed to their honeymoon "Bed-In" for peace in Amsterdam.
 March 22
 UCLA wins its third consecutive NCAA basketball championship by defeating Purdue University, 92 to 72.
 The landmark art exhibition When Attitudes become Form, curated by Harald Szeemann, opens at the Kunsthalle Bern in Bern, Switzerland.
 March 28 – Pope Paul VI increases the number of Roman Catholic cardinals by one-third, from 101 to 134.
 March 29 – The Eurovision Song Contest 1969 is held in Madrid, and results in four co-winners, with 18 votes each, from Spain, the United Kingdom, the Netherlands, and France.
 March 30 – The body of former United States General and President Dwight D. Eisenhower is brought by caisson to the United States Capitol to lie in state in the Capitol Rotunda; Eisenhower had died two days earlier, after a long illness, in the Walter Reed Army Medical Center, Washington, D.C.
 March 31 – The Barroterán coal mine disaster kills 153 coal miners in Mexico.

April

 April 4 – Dr. Denton Cooley implants the first temporary artificial heart.
 April 8 – The Montreal Expos become Major League Baseball's first team outside the United States.
 April 9 – Fermín Monasterio Pérez is murdered by the ETA in Biscay, Spain; the 4th victim in the name of Basque nationalism.
 April 13 – Queensland: The Brisbane Tramways end service after 84 years of operation.
 April 15 – The EC-121 shootdown incident: North Korea shoots down the aircraft over the Sea of Japan, killing all 31 on board.
 April 17 – Sirhan Bishara Sirhan is found guilty of the assassination of Robert F. Kennedy.
 April 20 – British troops arrive in Northern Ireland to reinforce the Royal Ulster Constabulary.
 April 22 – Robin Knox-Johnston becomes the first person to sail around the world solo without stopping.
 April 28 – Charles de Gaulle steps down as president of France after suffering defeat in a referendum the day before.

May
 May 4
 Zakir Husain, President of India, dies due to a heart attack.
 In a repeat of the previous season's hockey finals, the Montreal Canadiens defeat the St. Louis Blues four games to none to win the Stanley Cup.
 May 10 – The Battle of Dong Ap Bia, also known as Hamburger Hill, begins during the Vietnam War.
 May 13 – May 13 Incident: Race riots occur in Kuala Lumpur, Malaysia.
 May 14 – Colonel Muammar Gaddafi visits Mecca, Saudi Arabia.
 May 15 – An American teenager known as 'Robert R.' dies in St. Louis, Missouri, of a baffling medical condition. In 1984 it will be identified as the earliest confirmed case of HIV/AIDS in North America.
 May 16 – Venera program: Soviet space probe Venera 5 lands on Venus.
 May 17 – Venera program: Soviet space probe Venera 6 begins to descend into Venus's atmosphere, sending back atmospheric data before being crushed by pressure.
 May 18 – Apollo program: Apollo 10 (Gene Cernan, Tom Stafford, John Young) is launched. It is to be a full rehearsal for the Moon landing, stopping 15 kilometers short of actually reaching the lunar surface.
 May 20 – United States National Guard helicopters spray skin-stinging powder on anti-war protesters in California.
 May 21 – Rosariazo: Civil unrest breaks out in Rosario, Argentina, following the death of a 15-year-old student.
 May 22 – Apollo program: Apollo 10's lunar module flies to within 15,400 m of the Moon's surface.
 May 26
 The Andean Pact (Andean Group) is established.
 Apollo program: Apollo 10 returns to Earth, after a successful 8-day test of all the components needed for the upcoming first manned Moon landing.
 May 26–June 2 – John Lennon and Yoko Ono conduct their second Bed-In. The follow-up to the Amsterdam event is held at the Queen Elizabeth Hotel in Montreal, Quebec. Lennon composes and records the song "Give Peace a Chance" during the event.
 May 29 – Cordobazo: A general strike and civil unrest break out in Córdoba, Argentina.
 May 30 – Riots in Curaçao mark the start of an Afro-Caribbean civil rights movement on the island.

June

 June 3 – While operating at sea on SEATO maneuvers, the Australian aircraft carrier HMAS Melbourne accidentally rams and slices into the American destroyer USS Frank E. Evans in the South China Sea, killing 74 American seamen.
 June 5 – An international communist conference begins in Moscow.
 June 8 – Francisco Franco orders the closing of the Gibraltar–Spain border and communications between Gibraltar and Spain in response to the 1967 Gibraltar sovereignty referendum. The border remains closed until a partial reopening on December 15, 1982.
 June 8 – U.S. President Richard Nixon and South Vietnamese President Nguyễn Văn Thiệu meet at Midway Island. Nixon announces that 25,000 U.S. troops will be withdrawn by September.
 June 15 – Georges Pompidou is elected President of France.
 June 17 – After a 23-game match, Boris Spassky defeats Tigran Petrosian to become the World Chess Champion in Moscow.
 June 24 – The United Kingdom and Rhodesia sever diplomatic relations, after the Rhodesian constitutional referendum.
 June 27 – Gay intercourse is officially legalized in Canada.
 June 28 – The Stonewall riots, a milestone in the modern gay rights movement in the United States, began in New York City.

July

 July 7 – French is made equal to English throughout the Canadian national government.
 July 8 – Vietnam War: The very first U.S. troop withdrawals are made.
 July 14
 Football War: After Honduras loses an association football match against El Salvador, rioting breaks out in Honduras against Salvadoran migrant workers. Of the 300,000 Salvadoran workers in Honduras, tens of thousands are expelled, prompting a brief Salvadoran invasion of Honduras. The OAS works out a cease-fire on July 18, which takes effect on July 20.
 The Act of Free Choice for West Irian commences in Merauke, Indonesia.
 July 16 – Apollo program: Apollo 11 (Buzz Aldrin, Neil Armstrong, Michael Collins) lifts off from Cape Kennedy in Florida towards the first manned landing on the Moon.
 July 19
 Chappaquiddick incident: US Senator Edward M. Kennedy drives off a bridge into a tidal pond after leaving a party on Chappaquiddick Island, Massachusetts, killing Mary Jo Kopechne. Kennedy does not report the accident for nine or ten hours.
 John Fairfax lands in Hollywood Beach, Florida, United States and becomes the first person to row across an ocean solo, after 180 days spent at sea on board the 25' ocean rowboat Britannia (left Gran Canaria on January 20, 1969).
 July 20
 Apollo program Moon landing: At 3:17 pm ET (20:17 UTC) Apollo 11's Lunar Module Eagle lands on the Moon's surface. At 10:56 pm ET (02:56 UTC July 21), an estimated 650 million people worldwide, the largest television audience for a live broadcast at this time, watch in awe as Neil Armstrong takes his first historic steps on the surface.
 1969 Tour de France: Belgian Eddy Merckx wins the cycle race for the first time.
 July 22 – Spanish dictator and head of state Francisco Franco appoints Prince Juan Carlos to be his successor as head of state following his death.
 July 24
 Apollo 11 returns from the first successful Moon landing and the astronauts are placed in biological isolation for several days in case they may have brought back lunar germs. The airless lunar environment is later determined to rule out microscopic life.
 The Soviet Union returns British lecturer Gerald Brooke to the United Kingdom freed from a Soviet prison in exchange for their spies Peter and Helen Kroger (Morris and Lona Cohen).
 July 26 – A 6.4 earthquake shakes the Chinese city of Yangjiang destroying thousands of homes and killing 3,000 people.
 July 30 – Vietnam War: U.S. President Richard Nixon makes an unscheduled visit to South Vietnam, meeting with President Nguyễn Văn Thiệu and U.S. military commanders.
 July 31 – Pope Paul VI arrives in Entebbe, Uganda for the first visit by a reigning Pope to Africa.

August

 August 2 – U.S. President Richard Nixon visits Romania, becoming the first incumbent U.S. president to visit a communist state, since the start of the Cold War.
 August 4 – Vietnam War: At the apartment of French intermediary Jean Sainteny in Paris, U.S. representative Henry Kissinger and North Vietnamese representative Xuan Thuy begin secret peace negotiations. They eventually fail since the two sides cannot agree to any terms.
 August 5 – Mariner program: Mariner 7 makes its closest fly-by of Mars.
 August 13 – Serious border clashes occur between the Soviet Union and the People's Republic of China.
 August 14 – The Troubles: British troops are deployed in Northern Ireland to restore order following three days of political and sectarian violence, marking the beginning of the 37-year Operation Banner.
 August 15–18 – The Woodstock Festival is held near White Lake, New York, featuring some of the top rock musicians of the era.
 August 17 – Category 5 Hurricane Camille hits the Mississippi coast, killing 248 people and causing US$1.5 billion in damage (1969 USD).
 August 21
 Australian Denis Michael Rohan sets the Al-Aqsa Mosque on fire.
 Strong violence on demonstration in Prague and Brno, Czechoslovakia. Military force contra citizens. Prague spring finally beaten.
 August 29 – A Trans World Airlines flight from Rome to Tel Aviv is hijacked and diverted to Syria.

September

 September 1
 1969 Libyan coup d'état: A bloodless coup in Libya ousts King Idris and brings Colonel Muammar Gaddafi to power.
 For Brazil, the Jornal Nacional was created on Monday, 1 September 1969.
 September 2 – Ho Chi Minh, the president of North Vietnam, dies at the age of 79.
 September 5 – Lieutenant William Calley is charged with six counts of premeditated murder for the 1968 My Lai Massacre deaths of 109 Vietnamese civilians in My Lai, Vietnam.
 September 9 – Allegheny Airlines Flight 853, a DC-9 airliner, collides in flight with a small Piper PA-28 airplane, and crashes near Fairland, Indiana, killing all 83 people in both aircraft.
 September 11 – An annular solar eclipse is visible in Pacific Ocean and South America, and is the 41st solar eclipse of Solar Saros 134.
 September 22–25 – An Islamic conference in Rabat, Morocco, following the al-Aqsa Mosque fire (August 21), condemns the Israeli claim of ownership of Jerusalem.
 September 23 – China carries out an underground nuclear bomb test.
 September 25 – The Organisation of the Islamic Conference is founded.
 September 28 – 1969 West German federal election: The Social Democrats, led by Vice Chancellor Willy Brandt, and the Free Democrats led by Walter Scheel, formed a coalition government with Brandt as Chancellor, after the Social Democrats severed their relationship with Chancellor Kurt Georg Kiesinger's Christian Democratic Union.

October

 October 1
 In Sweden, Olof Palme is elected Leader of the Social Democratic Worker's Party, replacing Tage Erlander as Prime Minister on October 14.
 The Beijing Subway begins operation.
 October 2 – A 1.2 megaton thermonuclear device is tested at Amchitka Island, Alaska. This test is code-named Project Milrow, the 11th test of the Operation Mandrel 1969–1970 underground nuclear test series. This test is known as a "calibration shot" to test if the island is fit for larger underground nuclear detonations.
 October 5 – Sazae-san first airs on Fuji Television.
 October 9–12 – Days of Rage: In Chicago, the Illinois National Guard is called in to control demonstrations involving the radical Weathermen, in connection with the "Chicago Eight" Trial.
 October 11 – The Zodiac Killer shoots and kills taxi driver Paul Stine in the Presidio Heights neighborhood of San Francisco; this is the serial killer's last known murder.
 October 11–16 – The New York Mets upset the Baltimore Orioles four games to one in the World Series.
 October 15
 DZKB-TV Channel 9, the Philippines TV station, owned by Roberto S. Benedicto, is launched.
 Vietnam War: Hundreds of thousands of people take part in Moratorium to End the War in Vietnam demonstrations across the United States.
 October 17 – Willard S. Boyle and George Smith invent the CCD at Bell Laboratories (30 years later, this technology is widely used in digital cameras).
 October 20 – Experimental research showing that protons were composed of smaller particles, the first evidence of quarks, is published.
 October 21
 Willy Brandt becomes Chancellor of West Germany.
 General Siad Barre comes to power in Somalia in a coup, 6 days after the assassination of President Abdirashid Ali Shermarke.
 October 25 – 1969 Australian federal election: John Gorton's Liberal/Country Coalition Government is narrowly re-elected with a sharply reduced majority, defeating a resurgent Labor Party led by Gough Whitlam. Prime Minister Gorton survived a leadership challenge by his deputy William McMahon as well as David Fairbairn in the immediate aftermath of the election.
 October 29 – The first message is sent over ARPANET, the forerunner of the internet.

November

 November 3 – Süleyman Demirel of AP forms the new government of Turkey (31st government).
 November 10 – First episode of Sesame Street airs on PBS.
 November 14
 Apollo program: NASA launches Apollo 12 (Pete Conrad, Richard Gordon, Alan Bean), the second manned mission to the Moon.
 The SS United States, the last active United States Lines passenger ship, is withdrawn from service.
 November 15 – Cold War: The Soviet submarine K-19 collides with the American submarine USS Gato in the Barents Sea.
 November 17 – Cold War: Negotiators from the Soviet Union and the United States meet in Helsinki, to begin the SALT I negotiations aimed at limiting the number of strategic weapons on both sides.
 November 19
 Apollo program: Apollo 12 astronauts Charles Conrad and Alan Bean land at Oceanus Procellarum ("Ocean of Storms"), becoming the third and fourth humans to walk on the Moon.
 Professional footballer Pelé scores his 1,000th goal.
 Vietnam War: A Cleveland, Ohio newspaper, The Plain Dealer, publishes explicit photographs of dead villagers from the My Lai Massacre in Vietnam.
 Richard Oakes returns with 90 followers to Alcatraz Island and begins a 19 month long occupation, lasting until June 1971.
 November 21
 U.S. President Richard Nixon and Japanese Premier Eisaku Satō agree in Washington, D.C. to the return of Okinawa to Japanese control in 1972. Under the terms of the agreement, the U.S. retains rights to military bases on the island, but they must be nuclear-free.
 The first ARPANET link is established (the progenitor of the global Internet).
 November 24 – Apollo program: The Apollo 12 spacecraft splashes down safely in the Pacific Ocean, ending the second manned mission to the Moon.

December

 December 1 – Vietnam War: The first draft lottery in the United States since World War II is held. September 14 is the first of the 366 days of the year selected, meaning that anyone born on September 14 in the years from 1944 to 1951 would be the first to be summoned. On January 4, 1970, The New York Times will run a long article, "Statisticians Charge Draft Lottery Was Not Random".
 December 2 – The Boeing 747 jumbo jet makes its first passenger flight. It carries 191 people, most of them reporters and photographers, from Seattle to New York City.
 December 12 – The Piazza Fontana bombing in Milan, Italy, kills 17 people and injures 88.
 December 24
 Charles Manson is allowed to defend himself at the Tate-LaBianca murder trial.
 The oil company Phillips Petroleum made the first oil discovery in the Norwegian sector of North Sea.
 Nigerian troops capture Umuahia. The last Biafran capital before its dissolution becomes Owerri.
 December 27 – The Liberal Democratic Party wins 47.6% of the votes in the 1969 Japanese general election. Future prime ministers Yoshirō Mori and Tsutomu Hata and future kingmaker Ichirō Ozawa are elected for the first time.

Date unknown
 Summer – Invention of Unix under the potential name "Unics" (after Multics).
 Common African, Malagasy and Mauritian Organization (OCAMM) (Organisation Commune Africaine Malgache et Mauricienne) is established.
 International Convention on Civil Liability for Oil Pollution Damage, a maritime treaty, is adopted.

Births

January

 January 1 – Verne Troyer, American actor (d. 2018)
 January 2
 Robby Gordon, American racing driver
 Tommy Morrison, American boxer (d. 2013)
 Christy Turlington, American fashion model
 January 3 – Michael Schumacher, German seven-time Formula One world champion
 January 5 – Marilyn Manson, American rock musician
 January 6 – Norman Reedus, American actor
 January 7 – Alfredo Romero, Venezuelan activist
 January 11
 Kyōko Hikami, Japanese voice actress
 Kyle Richards, American actress
 January 13
 Beatriz Gutiérrez Müller, Mexican writer, wife of Andrés Manuel López Obrador
 Stephen Hendry, British snooker player
 January 14
 Jason Bateman, American actor, director and producer
 Dave Grohl, American rock drummer and composer
 January 15 – Meret Becker, German actress and musician
 January 16 – Dead, Swedish vocalist (d. 1991)
 January 17 – Lukas Moodysson, Swedish film director
 January 18 – Dave Bautista, actor and professional wrestler
 January 19
 Predrag Mijatović, Montenegrin footballer
 Robert Prosinečki, Croatian football player and coach
 January 27
 Cornelius, Japanese rock musician, singer and producer
 Patton Oswalt, American stand-up comedian, writer, actor and voice artist
 January 28 – Kathryn Morris, American actress
 January 29 – Hyde, Japanese rock musician, singer and guitarist
 January 31 – Bill Huizenga, American politician

February

 February 1
 Gabriel Batistuta, Argentine footballer
 Andrew Breitbart, American writer and publisher (d. 2012)
 February 2 – Dambisa Moyo, Zambian-born economist
 February 3 – Retief Goosen, South African golfer
 February 5
 Bobby Brown, African-American singer
 Michael Sheen, Welsh actor
 February 6 – David Hayter, Canadian-American actor, voice actor, screenwriter, director, and producer
 February 7 – Andrew Micallef, Maltese painter and musician
 February 11 – Jennifer Aniston, American actress, director, producer and businesswoman
 February 12
 Darren Aronofsky, American filmmaker
 Hong Myung-bo, South Korean footballer
 Brad Werenka, Canadian ice-hockey player
 February 13
 Ahlam, Emirati singer
 JB Blanc, French voice actor
 February 14 – Adriana Behar, Brazilian volleyball player
 February 15
 Roberto Balado, Cuban boxer (d. 1994)
 Birdman, American rapper, entertainer, and record producer
 February 17 – Dorothee Schneider, German dressage rider
 February 20 – Keiji Takayama, Japanese professional wrestler
 February 21
 James Dean Bradfield, Welsh singer-songwriter
 Bosson, Swedish singer-songwriter
 Petra Kronberger, Austrian alpine skier
 Tony Meola, American soccer player
 February 23
 Michael Campbell, New Zealand golfer
 Marc Wauters, Belgian cyclist
 February 28 – Robert Sean Leonard, American actor

March

 March 1 – Javier Bardem, Spanish actor
 March 4
 Annie Yi, Taiwanese actress
 Patrick Roach, Canadian actor
 March 10 – Paget Brewster, American actress
 March 11
 Terrence Howard, American actor and singer
 Soraya, Colombian singer and multi-instrumentalist (d. 2006)
 March 12
 Graham Coxon, English singer-songwriter, multi-instrumentalist and painter
 Akemi Okamura, Japanese voice actress
 March 13 – Susanna Mälkki, Finnish conductor
 March 15
 Timo Kotipelto, Finnish musician
 Yutaka Take, Japanese jockey
 March 16 – Markus Lanz, German-Italian television presenter
 March 17 – Alexander McQueen, British fashion designer (d. 2010)
 March 18
 Vassily Ivanchuk, Ukrainian chess grandmaster
 Jimmy Morales, Guatemalan politician, 37th President of Guatemala
 March 19 – Patrick Tam, Hong Kong actor
 March 21 – Ali Daei, Iranian football player
 March 22 – Tony Fadell, American engineer, inventor, designer and entrepreneur (Nest Labs, Apple Inc)
 March 24 – Stephan Eberharter, Austrian alpine skier
 March 25 – Jeffrey Walker, British musician
 March 26 – Suroosh Alvi, Canadian journalist and filmmaker
 March 27
 Mariah Carey, American pop singer
 Kevin Corrigan, American actor
 Pauley Perrette, American actress
 March 28 – Rodney Atkins, American country music singer
 March 29 – Chiaki Ishikawa, Japanese singer (See-Saw)

April

 April 1
 Fadl Shaker, Lebanese singer
 Andrew Vlahov, Australian basketball player
 April 2 – Ajay Devgn, Indian actor, director and producer
 April 3
 Ben Mendelsohn, Australian actor
 Lance Storm, Canadian professional wrestler
 April 6
 Paul Rudd, American actor, comedian, writer and producer
 Anne-Marie Trevelyan, British politician
 April 11
 Oriol Junqueras, Catalan-Spanish politician
 Cerys Matthews, Welsh singer
 Caren Miosga, German journalist and television presenter
 Chisato Moritaka, Japanese singer
 April 16 – Dawn Brancheau, American senior animal trainer (d. 2010)
 April 18
 Shannon Lee, Chinese-American actress
 Susan Polgár, Hungarian chess player
 April 20 – Marietta Slomka, German journalist
 April 21 – Toby Stephens, English actor
 April 22 – Dion Dublin, English footballer
 April 23 – Yelena Shushunova, Soviet gymnast (d. 2018)
 April 25
 Vanessa Beecroft, Italian artist
 Gina Torres, American actress
 Renée Zellweger, American Academy Award-winning actress and producer

May

 May 1 – Wes Anderson, American filmmaker
 May 2
 Brian Lara, Trinidadian cricketer.
 Corinna Schumacher, German animal rights activist and accomplished horse rider
 May 4 – Rabindra Prasad Adhikari, Nepalese politician (d. 2019)
 May 5 – Hideki Irabu, Japanese baseball player (d. 2011)
 May 6 – Jim Magilton, Northern Irish footballer
 May 7 – Katerina Maleeva, Bulgarian tennis player
 May 9 – Amber, German musician
 May 10 – Dennis Bergkamp, Dutch footballer
 May 13
 Nikos Aliagas, French-born television host
 Brian Carroll (aka Buckethead), American guitarist
 May 14 – Cate Blanchett, Australian actress
 May 15 – Assala, Syrian singer
 May 16
 David Boreanaz, American actor
 Tucker Carlson, American political commentator
 Steve Lewis, American athlete
 May 19 – Teresa Ribera, Spanish politician
 May 21 – Georgiy Gongadze, Ukrainian journalist (d. 2000)
 May 26 – Siri Lindley, American triathlete
 May 28 – Rob Ford, Canadian politician, 64th Mayor of Toronto (d. 2016)

June

 June 3 – Takako Minekawa, Japanese musician, composer and writer
 June 4 – Rob Huebel, American comedian
 June 7
 Alina Astafei, Romanian-German high jumper
 Prince Joachim of Denmark
 Kim Rhodes, American actress
 June 8 – J. P. Manoux, American actor
 June 11
 Peter Dinklage, American actor
 Steven Drozd, American rock drummer
 Anatoliy Povedenok, Kazakh football player
 June 12
 Zsolt Daczi, Hungarian rock guitarist (d. 2007)
 Heinz-Christian Strache, Austrian politician
 June 13 – Søren Rasted, Danish musician
 June 14
 Eugene Chung, Korean-American football player
 Steffi Graf, German tennis player
 June 15
 Ice Cube, African-American rapper and actor
 Oliver Kahn, German football goalkeeper
 Jansher Khan, Pakistani squash player
 June 16 – MC Ren, American rapper
 June 17 – Paul Tergat, Kenyan athlete
 June 18 – Haki Doku, Albanian para-cyclist
 June 19 – Trine Pallesen, Danish actress
 June 20
 Alexander Schallenberg, current Chancellor of Austria
 Paulo Bento, Portuguese football player and coach
 June 23
 Noa, Israeli singer
 Fernanda Ribeiro, Portuguese long-distance runner
 June 24 – Sissel Kyrkjebø, Norwegian singer
 June 30 – Sanath Jayasuriya, Sri Lankan cricketer

July

 July 2
 Jenni Rivera, Mexican-American singer-songwriter, producer and actress (d. 2012)
 Tim Rodber, English rugby player
 July 3
 Gedeon Burkhard, German actor
 Shawnee Smith, American actress
 July 5 – John LeClair, American hockey player
 July 7
 Sylke Otto, German luger
 Joe Sakic, Canadian hockey player
 Cree Summer, American-Canadian actress and singer
 July 8 – Sugizo, Japanese guitarist and singer
 July 9 – Munkhbayar Dorjsuren, Mongolian-German sport shooter
 July 10
 Gale Harold, American actor
 Hossan Leong, Singaporean stage and screen actor, television host, radio deejay and comedian
 Jonas Kaufmann, German operatic tenor
 Rami Makhlouf, Syrian businessman
 July 11 – David Tao, Taiwanese singer-songwriter
 July 14 – Billy Herrington, American gay pornographic actor (d. 2018)
 July 16
 Björn Dunkerbeck, Danish windsurfer
 Sahra Wagenknecht, German politician
 July 17
 Jason Clarke, Australian actor
 Ravi Kishan, Indian actor
 Kazuki Kitamura, Japanese actor
 July 18 – The Great Sasuke, Japanese wrestler
 July 20
 Josh Holloway, American actor
 Johnny Ngauamo, Tonga rugby union player
 July 21
 Avraam Russo, Russian singer
 Isabell Werth, German equestrian
 July 22
 Jason Becker, American heavy metal guitarist, formerly of Cacophony
 James Arnold Taylor, American voice actor
 Despina Vandi, Greek singer
 July 23 – Raphael Warnock, American pastor and junior senator from Georgia
 July 24 – Jennifer Lopez, American actress and singer
 July 25 – Annastacia Palaszczuk, Australian politician, Premier of Queensland 
 July 26 – Tanni Grey-Thompson, born Carys Grey, British Paralympian
 July 27
 Dacian Cioloș, 64th Prime Minister of Romania
 Pavel Hapal, Czech footballer
 Jonty Rhodes, South African cricketer
 Triple H, American wrestler
 July 28
 Michael Amott, Swedish guitarist and songwriter
 Alexis Arquette, American actress, cabaret performer, underground cartoonist, and activist (d. 2016)
 Dana White, American businessman and president of Ultimate Fighting Championship
 July 30 – Simon Baker, Australian-American actor and director
 July 31 – Antonio Conte, Italian football player and manager

August

 August 2
 Jan Axel Blomberg, Norwegian drummer
 Fernando Couto, Portuguese footballer
 August 3 – Anne Marie DeLuise, Canadian actress
 August 4
 Max Cavalera, Brazilian musician and singer (Soulfly, Cavalera Conspiracy, ex-Sepultura)
 Michael DeLuise, American actor
 August 6 – Elliott Smith, American musician (d. 2003)
 August 8 – Faye Wong, Hong Kong singer and actress
 August 10 – Brian Drummond, Canadian voice actor
 August 11
 Vanderlei de Lima, Brazilian long-distance runner
 Ashley Jensen, British actress
 August 12 – Tanita Tikaram, German-born British singer-songwriter
 August 13 – Midori Ito, Japanese figure skater
 August 15
 Justin Broadrick, British musician
 Kevin Cheng, Hong Kong television actor and singer
 Bernard Fanning, Australian musician (Powderfinger)
 John Fetterman, American politician, Senator of Pennsylvania 
 August 17
 Uhm Jung-hwa, South Korean singer and actress
 Christian Laettner, American professional basketball player
 Dick Togo, Japanese professional wrestler
 Donnie Wahlberg, American singer and actor (New Kids on the Block)
 August 18
 Edward Norton, American actor, film director, screenwriter, and social activist
 Christian Slater, American actor and producer
 Timothy Snyder, American author and historian
 August 19
 Nate Dogg, African-American rapper (d. 2011)
 Matthew Perry, American actor
 August 28 – Jack Black, American actor and musician
 August 29 – Lucero, Mexican singer and actress
 August 30 – Kent Osborne, American actor and producer

September

 September 3 – Robert Karlsson, Swedish golfer
 September 4 – Giorgi Margvelashvili, politician; 4th President of the Republic of Georgia
 September 6
 Michellie Jones, Australian triathlete
 Cece Peniston, American musician
 September 7 – Diane Farr, American actress
 September 8 – Gary Speed, Welsh footballer and manager (d. 2011)
 September 9 – Rachel Hunter, New Zealand model and actress
 September 12
 Ángel Cabrera, Argentine golfer
 Shigeki Maruyama, Japanese golfer
 September 13
 Tyler Perry, American actor, film director and screenwriter
 Shane Warne, Australian cricketer (d. 2022)
 September 14 – Bong Joon-ho, South Korean film director and screenwriter
 September 17 – Ken Doherty, Irish snooker player
 September 19
 Simona Păucă, Romanian gymnast
 LeRoy Whitfield, African-American freelance journalist (d. 2005)
 September 24 – Shawn Crahan, American rock percussionist
 September 25
 Hansie Cronje, South African cricketer (d. 2002)
 Catherine Zeta-Jones, Welsh actress
 September 29 – Erika Eleniak, American model and actress
 September 30 – Jackie Traverse, Canadian artist and activist

October

 October 1
 Zach Galifianakis, American actor and stand-up comedian
 Igor Ulanov, Russian hockey player
 Marcus Stephen, Former President of Nauru
 October 3
 Gwen Stefani, American singer, actress, and television host
 Tetsuya, Japanese musician
 October 5 – Elizabeth Azcona Bocock, Honduran politician
 October 6
 Muhammad V of Kelantan, 15th Yang di-Pertuan Agong of Malaysia and Sultan of Kelantan
 Ogün Temizkanoğlu, Turkish football player
 October 7 – Benny Chan Ho Man, Hong Kong actor
 October 9
 Jun Akiyama, Japanese professional wrestler
 PJ Harvey, British singer-songwriter
 Steve McQueen, English film director, producer and screenwriter
 October 10
 Brett Favre, American football player
 Wendi McLendon-Covey, American actress
 October 11 – Merieme Chadid, Moroccan born-French astronomer
 October 12 – Judit Mascó, Spanish model, television host and writer
 October 13
 Rhett Akins, American country singer
 Nancy Kerrigan, American figure skater
 Cady McClain, American actress and director
 October 15 – Kim Raver, American actress
 October 16 – Wendy Wilson, American singer and television personality
 October 17
 Ernie Els, South African golfer
 Jesús Ángel García, Spanish race walker
 Wood Harris, American actor
 Wyclef Jean, Haitian rapper
 Nancy Sullivan, American actress
 October 19
 Pedro Castillo, 130th President of Peru
 Vanessa Marshall, American actress and voice actress
 Trey Parker, American actor, voice actor, animator, writer, producer, director, and composer
 October 20
 Laurie Daley, Australian rugby league player
 Juan González, American baseball player
 October 21 – Michael Hancock, Australian rugby league player
 October 22 – Spike Jonze, American director and filmmaker
 October 24
 Peter Dolving, Swedish musician
 Adela Noriega, Mexican actress
 October 25
 Samantha Bee, Canadian comedian, writer, producer, and political commentator
 Josef Beránek, Czech ice hockey player
 Oleg Salenko, Russian football player
 October 28
 Steven Chamuleau, Dutch cardiologist
 October 30
 Stanislav Gross, 5th Prime Minister of the Czech Republic (d. 2015)
 Snow, Canadian singer
 October 31 – Kim Rossi Stuart, Italian actor and director

November

 November 1 – Gary Alexander, American basketball player
 November 2
 Reginald Arvizu (aka Fieldy Snuts), American bassist
 William DeVizia, American actor
 November 3 – Robert Miles, Swiss-born Italian record producer and DJ (d. 2017)
 November 4
 Sean Combs, American rapper and entrepreneur
 Matthew McConaughey, American actor
 November 7
 Michelle Clunie, American actress
 Hélène Grimaud, French pianist
 November 8 – Jonathan Slavin, American actor and activist
 November 9 – Allison Wolfe, American musician
 November 10
 Faustino Asprilla, Colombian football player
 Jens Lehmann, German football player
 Ellen Pompeo, American actress
 November 12
 Tomas N'evergreen, Danish singer
 Rob Schrab, American actor and comic book creator
 November 13
 Ayaan Hirsi Ali, Somali-born Dutch American activist
 Gerard Butler, Scottish actor
 November 17 – Jean-Michel Saive, Belgian table tennis player
 November 18
 Kathleen van Brempt, Belgian politician
 Sam Cassell, American basketball player
 Ahmed Helmy, Egyptian actor
 November 19
 Ertuğrul Sağlam, Turkish football coach and former player
 Viktor Skrypnyk, Ukrainian football coach and former player
 November 21 – Ken Griffey Jr., American baseball player
 November 22 – Katrin Krabbe, German sprinter
 November 23 – Robin Padilla, Filipino actor
 November 24 – David Adeang, Nauruan politician
 November 26 – Kara Walker, American artist
 November 27 – Carina Ricco, Mexican actress and singer
 November 28
 Colman Domingo, African-American actor
 Lexington Steele, African-American actor and film director
 November 29
 Pierre van Hooijdonk, Dutch footballer
 Kasey Keller, American Major League Soccer player
 Mariano Rivera, Panamanian-American professional baseball player
 November 30 – Trina Gulliver, English darts player

December

 December 1 – Richard Carrier, American historian
 December 4 – Jay-Z, African-American rapper
 December 5
 Sajid Javid, British Pakistani politician, Chancellor of the Exchequer
 Catherine Tate, English actress, comedian, and writer
 December 9 – Bixente Lizarazu, French footballer
 December 11 – Viswanathan Anand, Indian chess grandmaster
 December 16 – Michelle Smith, Irish swimmer
 December 17
 Laurie Holden, American actress, producer, model and human rights activist
 Chuck Liddell, American mixed martial arts fighter
 December 18
 Santiago Cañizares, Spanish footballer
 Irvin Duguid, Scottish rock keyboard player (Stiltskin)
 Mille Petrozza, German-Italian rock vocalist and guitarist (Kreator)
 Joe Randa, American Major League Baseball player and radio talk-show host
 December 19
 Richard Hammond, British television presenter
 Lauren Sánchez, American news anchor
 Kristy Swanson, American actress
 December 21
 Julie Delpy, French actress
 Magnus Samuelsson, Swedish bodybuilder, World's Strongest Man
 December 22 – Dagmar Hase, German swimmer
 December 24
 Milan Blagojevic, Australian footballer
 Pernille Fischer Christensen, Danish film director
 Leavander Johnson, American lightweight boxer (d. 2005)
 Sean Cameron Michael, South African actor and singer
 Ed Miliband, English academic and politician, Minister for the Cabinet Office
 Mark Millar, Scottish author
 Luis Musrri, Chilean footballer
 Oleg Skripochka, Russian cosmonaut
 Gintaras Staučė, Lithuanian footballer
 Chen Yueling, American race walker
 Jonathan Zittrain, American professor
 December 25 – Nicolas Godin, French musician
 December 27
 Chyna, American professional wrestler (d. 2016)
 Sarah Vowell, American historian, author, journalist, essayist, social commentator and actress
 December 28 – Linus Torvalds, Finnish computer programmer
 December 30
 Kersti Kaljulaid, 5th President of Estonia
 Jay Kay, English singer (Jamiroquai)

Deaths

January

 January 1
 Barton MacLane, American actor (b. 1902)
 Bruno Söderström, Swedish athlete (b. 1881)
 January 3 – Commodore Cochran, American Olympic athlete (b. 1902)
 January 4 – Paul Chambers, American jazz bassist (b. 1935)
 January 8 – Albert Hill, British athlete (b. 1889)
 January 19 – Jan Palach, Czech student (b. 1948)
 January 27 – Charles Winninger, American actor (b. 1884)
 January 29 – Allen Dulles, American director of the Central Intelligence Agency (b. 1893)
 January 30 – Dominique Pire, Belgian Dominican friar, Nobel Peace Prize laureate (b. 1910)
 January 31 – Meher Baba, Indian spiritual master (b. 1894)

February

 February 2 – Boris Karloff, English actor (b. 1887)
 February 3
 Eduardo Mondlane, leader of the Mozambique nationalist organization FRELIMO (b. 1920)
 Al Taliaferro, American Disney comics artist (b. 1905)
 February 5 – Thelma Ritter, American actress (b. 1902)
 February 9 – George "Gabby" Hayes, American actor (b. 1885)
 February 13 – Florence Mary Taylor, English-born Australian architect (b. 1879)
 February 14 – Vito Genovese, Italian-American mobster (b. 1897)
 February 18 – Dragiša Cvetković, 13th Prime Minister of Yugoslavia (b. 1893)
 February 19 – Madge Blake, American actress (b. 1899)
 February 20 – Ernest Ansermet, Swiss conductor (b. 1883)
 February 23
 Saud bin Abdulaziz Al Saud, King of Saudi Arabia (b. 1902)
 Madhubala, Indian actress (b. 1933)
 February 25 – Jan Zajíc, Czech student (b. 1950)
 February 26
 Levi Eshkol, 3rd Prime Minister of Israel (b. 1895)
 Karl Jaspers, German psychiatrist and philosopher (b. 1883)
 February 27 – John Boles, American actor (b. 1895)

March

 March 3
 Ali Jawdat al-Aiyubi, 11th Prime Minister of Iraq (b. 1886)
 Fred Alexander, American tennis player (b. 1880)
 March 6 – Óscar Osorio, Salvadorian military leader, 32nd President of El Salvador (b. 1910)
 March 11 – John Wyndham, English author (b. 1903)
 March 14 – Ben Shahn, Lithuanian-American artist (b. 1898)
 March 24 – Joseph Kasavubu, 1st President of Congo-Léopoldville (b. 1917)
 March 25 – Max Eastman, American writer (b. 1883)
 March 26 – John Kennedy Toole, American author (b. 1937)
 March 28 – Dwight D. Eisenhower, American general and politician, 34th President of the United States (b. 1890)

April

 April 2 – Fortunio Bonanova, Spanish actor and singer (b. 1895)
 April 5
 Alberto Bonucci, Italian actor and director (b. 1918)
 Rómulo Gallegos, Venezuelan novelist and politician, 48th President of Venezuela (b. 1884)
 April 10 – Harley Earl, American designer and executive (b. 1893)
 April 15 – Victoria Eugenie of Battenberg, former Queen consort of Spain (b. 1887)
 April 20 – Vjekoslav Luburić, Croatian Ustaše official and concentration camp administrator (b. 1914)
 April 26 – Morihei Ueshiba, Japanese martial artist and founder of aikido (b. 1883)
 April 27 – René Barrientos , Bolivian general and statesman, 47th President of Bolivia (helicopter crash) (b. 1919)

May

 May 2 – Franz von Papen, 22nd Chancellor of Germany and 26th Prime Minister of Prussia (b. 1879)
 May 3
 Karl Freund, German cinematographer (b. 1890)
 Zakir Hussain, Indian politician, 3rd President of India (b. 1897)
 May 6 – Don Drummond, Jamaican ska musician (b. 1932)
 May 14
 Enid Bennett, American actress (b. 1893)
 Frederick Lane, Australian swimmer (b. 1888)
 May 15 – Robert Rayford, American HIV/AIDS victim (b. 1953)
 May 18 – Camille Drevet, French anti-colonialist, feminist activist and pacifist (b. 1881)
 May 21 – William Lincoln Bakewell, American explorer (b. 1888)
 May 23 – Jimmy McHugh, American composer (b. 1894)
 May 24 – Mitzi Green, American actress (b. 1920)
 May 26 – Paul Hawkins, Australian racing driver (b. 1937)
 May 27
 Muhammad Fareed Didi, Sultan of Maldives (b. 1901)
 Jeffrey Hunter, American actor (b. 1926)

June

 June 1 – Ivar Ballangrud, Norwegian Olympic speed skater (b. 1904)
 June 4 – Rafael Osuna, Mexican professional tennis player (b. 1938)
 June 8 – Robert Taylor, American actor (b. 1911)
 June 11 – John L. Lewis, President of the United Mine Workers of America (b. 1889)
 June 12 – Aleksandr Deyneka, Russian painter and sculptor (b. 1899)
 June 16 – Harold Alexander, 1st Earl Alexander of Tunis, 17th Governor General of Canada (b. 1891)
 June 18 – Edgar Anderson, American botanist (b. 1897)
 June 19 – Natalie Talmadge, American actress (b. 1896)
 June 20 – Mohamed Siddiq El-Minshawi, Egyptian Qur'anic reciter (b. 1920)
 June 22 – Judy Garland, American actress and singer (b. 1922)
 June 23 – Volmari Iso-Hollo, Finnish athlete (b. 1907)

July

 July 2 – Mikio Naruse, Japanese film director (b. 1905)
 July 3 – Brian Jones, British rock musician (b. 1942)
 July 5
 Ben Alexander, American actor (b. 1911)
 Wilhelm Backhaus, German pianist (b. 1884)
 Walter Gropius, German architect (b. 1883)
 Lambert Hillyer, American film director (b. 1889)
 Tom Mboya, Kenyan politician (b. 1930)
 Leo McCarey, American film director (b. 1898)
 July 9 – Raizō Tanaka, Japanese admiral (b. 1892)
 July 15 – Peter van Eyck, German actor (b. 1911)
 July 17 – Ichikawa Raizō VIII, Japanese actor (b. 1931)
 July 20 – Roy Hamilton, American singer (b. 1929)
 July 24 – Witold Gombrowicz, Polish novelist and dramatist (b. 1904)
 July 25 – Otto Dix, German painter (b. 1891)
 July 28
 Frank Loesser, American songwriter (b. 1910)
 Ramón Grau, president of Cuba (b. 1882)

August

 August 5 – Duke Adolf Friedrich of Mecklenburg (b. 1873)
 August 6 – Theodor W. Adorno, German sociologist and philosopher (b. 1903)
 August 8 – Choi Seung-hee, Korean modern dancer (b. 1911)
 August 9
 Cecil Frank Powell, British physicist, Nobel Prize laureate (b. 1903)
 Constantin Ion Parhon, Romanian politician (b. 1874)
 Jay Sebring, American celebrity hair stylist (b. 1933)
 Sharon Tate, American actress and model (b. 1943)
 August 13 – Nicolás Fasolino, Argentine Roman Catholic cardinal (b. 1887)
 August 14 – Leonard Woolf, English writer (b. 1880)
 August 17
 Ludwig Mies van der Rohe, German-American architect (b. 1886)
 Otto Stern, German physicist, Nobel Prize laureate (b. 1888)
 August 18 – Mildred Davis, American actress (b. 1901)
 August 20 – Marty Barry, Canadian ice hockey player (b. 1905)
 August 26 – Ismail al-Azhari, 2nd Prime Minister, 3rd President of Sudan (b. 1900)
 August 27
 Dame Ivy Compton-Burnett, English novelist (b. 1884)
 Erika Mann, German writer (b. 1905)
 August 31 – Rocky Marciano, American professional boxer (b. 1923)

September

 September 2 – Ho Chi Minh, Vietnamese Communist politician, 1st Prime Minister of North Vietnam and 1st President of North Vietnam (b. 1890)
 September 3 – John Lester, American cricketer (b. 1871)
 September 6 – Arthur Friedenreich, Brazilian footballer (b. 1892)
 September 8
 Bud Collyer, American radio and television personality (b. 1908)
 Alexandra David-Néel, French explorer (b. 1868)
 September 19 – Rex Ingram, American actor (b. 1895)
 September 22
 Adolfo López Mateos, Mexican politician, 48th President of Mexico, 1958-1964 (b. 1909)
 Aleksandras Stulginskis, Lithuanian politician, 2nd President of the Republic of Lithuania (b. 1885)
 September 27 – Nicolas Grunitzky, 2nd President of Togo (b. 1913)
 September 28 – Nicolae Dăscălescu, Romanian general (b. 1884)

October

 October 3 – Skip James, American blues singer (b. 1902)
 October 6 – Walter Hagen, American golf champion (b. 1892)
 October 7
 Natalya Lisenko, Russian actress (b. 1884)
 Ture Nerman, Swedish communist leader (b. 1886)
 October 8 – Eduardo Ciannelli, Italian actor and singer (b. 1888)
 October 12 – Sonja Henie, Norwegian figure skater (b. 1912)
 October 16 – Leonard Chess, Polish-American record company executive, co-founder of Chess Records (b. 1917)
 October 21
 Jack Kerouac, American author (b. 1922)
 Wacław Sierpiński, Polish mathematician (b. 1882)
 October 26 – Gyula Mándi, Hungarian footballer and manager (b. 1899)
 October 29 – Francisco Orlich Bolmarcich, 34th President of Costa Rica (b. 1907)
 October 31 – Carlos Alberto Arroyo del Río, 26th President of Ecuador, leader during World War II (b. 1893)

November

 November 1 – Pauline Bush, American actress (b. 1886)
 November 5 – Lloyd Corrigan, American actor (b. 1900)
 November 8
 Dave O'Brien, American actor (b. 1912)
 Vesto Slipher, American astronomer (b. 1875)
 November 12 – William F. Friedman, American cryptanalyst (b. 1891)
 November 13 – Iskander Mirza, Pakistani politician, 1st President of Pakistan (b. 1899)
 November 18 – Joseph P. Kennedy Sr., American politician (b. 1888)
 November 21
 Norman Lindsay, Australian painter (b. 1879)
 Mutesa II of Buganda, Kabaka of Buganda and 1st President of Uganda (b. 1924)

December

 December 1 – Magic Sam, American musician (b. 1937)
 December 2 – Kliment Voroshilov, Soviet military commander (b. 1881)
 December 4 – Fred Hampton, American activist (b. 1948)
 December 5
 Princess Alice of Battenberg (b. 1885)
 Claude Dornier, German airplane builder, founder of Dornier Flugzeugwerke (b. 1884)
 December 6 – João Cândido Felisberto, Brazilian sailor, led the Revolt of the Lash (b. 1880)
 December 8
 Karl Fiehler, German Politician of the Nazi Party (NSDAP) and Lord Mayor of Munich (b. 1895)
 Ole Singstad, Norwegian-born American civil engineer (b. 1882)
 December 13
 Spencer Williams Jr., American actor (b. 1893)
 Raymond A. Spruance, American admiral (b. 1886)
 December 21 – Georges Catroux, French Army general and colonial governor (b. 1877)
 December 22
 Josef von Sternberg, Austrian film director (b. 1894)
 Enrique Peñaranda , Bolivian general, 38th President of Bolivia, leader during World War II (b. 1892)
 December 29 – Ricardo Adolfo de la Guardia Arango, 11th President of Panama, leader during World War II (b. 1899)

Nobel Prizes
 Physics – Murray Gell-Mann
 Chemistry – Derek Barton, Odd Hassel
 Medicine – Max Delbrück, Alfred Hershey, Salvador Luria
 Literature – Samuel Beckett
 Peace – International Labour Organization
 Economics – Ragnar Frisch, Jan Tinbergen

References 

 1969 – Headlines A report from Rich Lamb of WCBS Newsradio 880 (WCBS-AM New York) Part of WCBS 880's celebration of 40 years of newsradio.
 1969 – The Year in Sound An Audiofile produced by Lou Zambrana of WCBS Newsradio 880 (WCBS-AM New York) Part of WCBS 880's celebration of 40 years of newsradio.